The murder of Lesandro Guzman-Feliz occurred on June 20, 2018; the 15-year-old was killed by members of the Dominican-American gang Trinitarios in the Belmont neighborhood of the Bronx. The death occurred in a case of mistaken identity.  Public outrage arose when graphic video of the murder began to circulate on the Internet. Fourteen suspects, all members of the Trinitario gang, were arrested in connection with Guzman-Feliz's death.

Murder 

On June 20, 2018, at 11:30 p.m. (EDT), 15-year-old Lesandro "Junior" Guzman-Feliz left his apartment to meet with a friend.  While out, he noticed four vehicles and became alarmed.  He began to run and was chased for several blocks by gang members occupying the vehicles.  Eventually, Guzman-Feliz sought refuge in a bodega at Bathgate Avenue and East 183rd Street in Belmont, Bronx, near his residence. The store owner (and others) witnessed the attack but initially prevented Junior from hiding behind the counter, being at first unsure of precisely what was occurring. After recognizing Junior and seeing his fear, the store owner relented and allowed him behind the counter, but Junior was nevertheless spotted by one of the gang members, who then proceeded to drag him outside, where three others waited. 

The brutal killing had a significant impact upon the bodega owner. The bodega owner's mother had a heart attack after viewing the security footage of the incident and died. The bodega owner had thoughts of self-harm and had to seek psychological therapy. 

The incident was captured on CCTV video inside the shop, as well as on cell phone video taken from an overhead angle by a resident of one of the building's upper floors.  The cell phone video shows a dozen or more males arriving and departing at the scene.  Bodega surveillance footage shows several men stabbing Guzman-Feliz with large knives and machetes. The video shows Guzman-Feliz re-entering the  store; however, he appeared to be sent outside. The video shows him stumbling out of the bodega and running east on 183rd Street toward St. Barnabas Hospital, one block away. Cell phone footage showed Guzman-Feliz collapse on a step at a security booth a few yards from the hospital entrance. The video shows witnesses who knew the victim screaming frantically, holding cloths to his wounds, and attempting to console him as he died. Guzman-Feliz' death occurred only  minutes after the attack at the bodega.

According to the boyfriend of Guzman-Feliz's sister, a Trinitario gang leader stated on Snapchat that the killing was a case of mistaken identity.  Initial reports indicated that the incident was sparked by a sex video involving a gang member's niece and a curly-haired male teenager, who looked very similar to Guzman-Feliz. However these reports had nothing to do with the case as it was later discovered that the video was a prank and was recorded long before the killing.  The gang apologized for the killing to the victim's family on social media.  In addition, the gang leader expelled the killers from the gang as a result of this mistaken-identity killing. Police indicated, though, that the alleged killers, all members of the Trinitarios subset "Los Sures", mistakenly believed that Guzman-Feliz was a member of the rival gang "Sunset".

A hashtag, #justiceforjunior, was created and went viral on social media outlets such as Twitter and Instagram.  Public outrage ensued when the graphic video of Guzman-Feliz's killing began to circulate on the Internet. Police tip lines received a "torrent" of calls from witnesses and other people identifying the suspects. Officers' posts on Twitter and Instagram were shared and viewed over 100,000 times.

Motive 

The killing of Guzman-Feliz was purportedly a case of mistaken identity of a teen who was part of a rival gang.  The police reported that the  killers, all members of the Trinitarios subset "Los Sures", mistakenly believed that Guzman-Feliz was a member of the rival "Sunset" gang. Bronx County District Attorney Darcel Clark said that Guzman-Feliz had no ties to any gang activity.

Victim 

Lesandro Guzman-Feliz (November 11, 2002 –  June 20, 2018), known as "Junior", was 15 years old at the time of his death.  His family included: his father, Lisandro Guzman; his mother, Leandra Feliz; his older sister, Genesis Collado-Feliz; and his brother, Manuel Ortiz. He attended the Dr. Richard Izquierdo Health & Science Charter School, where he was a sophomore.  He was of Dominican descent.

Guzman-Feliz aspired to become a detective and was a member of the New York City Police Department (NYPD) Explorers program, a group for youths interested in law enforcement careers. His funeral, at Our Lady of Mount Carmel Church in the Bronx, was attended by thousands.  Pallbearers were attired in New York Yankees jerseys as a nod to Guzman-Feliz's favorite baseball team.  He was interred in Saint Raymond's Cemetery in the Bronx.

After his death, the NYPD established a scholarship in Guzman-Feliz's name. The corner of Bathgate Avenue and 183rd Street, where Guzman-Feliz was killed, was ceremonially renamed "Lesandro Junior Guzman-Feliz Way" in February 2019, on his mother's birthday.

Perpetrators and suspects 

Fourteen suspects were arrested in connection with Guzman-Feliz's death. All were members of the Dominican gang Trinitario and between the age of 18 and 29.

 Kevin Alvarez, age 19
 Luis Cabrera-Santos, age 25
 Danel Fernandez, age 21 
 Elvin Garcia, age 23
 Antonio Rodriguez Hernandez, age 24
 Jonaiki Martinez-Estrella, age 24 
 Jose Muniz, age 21
 Danilo Payamps-Pacheco, age 21            
 Gabriel Ramirez-Concepcion, age 26
 Manuel Rivera, age 18
 Diego Suero, age 29
 Jose Taverez, age 21
 Fredrick Then, age 20
 Ronald Ureña, age 29

Police alleged Suero to be the ringleader, who ordered the murder of Guzman-Feliz. Officers also claimed that Martinez-Estrella delivered the fatal blow to Guzman-Feliz.

Four of the suspects (Fernandez, Muniz, Rivera, and Hernandez) were incarcerated at Rikers Island and received death threats, even from other members of the Trinitario gang, while awaiting trial.  As such, they were segregated from other prisoners and received heightened security protection at the jail. In December 2018, while detained at Rikers Island, Rivera received a slash wound on his face from a fellow inmate. The suspect was allegedly a rival gang member. Michael Sosa Reyes, a former suspect, was a cooperating witness.

Trial verdict 

Nearly a full year after Guzman-Feliz was killed outside of the Bronx bodega, five accused suspects were convicted of his murder. In a Bronx courtroom on June 14, 2019, a jury convicted Jonaiki Martinez Estrella, Manuel Rivera, Elvin Garcia, Jose Muniz, and Antonio Rodriguez Hernandez of first-degree murder, second-degree murder, gang assault, and conspiracy.    By also convicting the defendants of first-degree murder, the jury acknowledged that Guzman-Feliz was tortured before his death.

See also 

 Crime in New York City
 Gangs in the United States

References 

2018 crimes in New York (state)
2018 in New York City
2018 murders in the United States
2010s in the Bronx
Attacks in the United States in 2018
Belmont, Bronx
Burials at Saint Raymond's Cemetery (Bronx)
Deaths by person in New York City
Deaths by stabbing in New York (state)
Dominican-American culture
Filmed killings
June 2018 crimes in the United States
Crimes in the Bronx
Murdered American children
Incidents of violence against boys